Francisco Gutiérrez may refer to:

 Francisco Gutierrez (1962–2005), also known as Franky G, frontman for the German Europop group Captain Jack
 Francisco Gutiérrez (sprinter) (born 1941), Colombian Olympic sprinter
 Francisco Gutiérrez Álvarez (born 1980), Spanish cyclist
 Francisco Gutiérrez, candidate in the Chilean parliamentary election, 2009
 Francisco Gutiérrez, sculptor, examples of whose work can be found in the Church of Santa Barbara, Madrid